

Paleozoology

Arthropods

Newly named insects

Conodont paleozoology 
German paleontologist and stratigrapher Heinz Walter Kozur (1942-2013) described the conodont genus Mesogondolella.

Vertebrate paleozoology

Plesiosaurs 
 Plesiosaur gastroliths documented.

New taxa

Archosauromorphs

Newly named pseudosuchians

Newly named dinosaurs 
Data courtesy of George Olshevsky's dinosaur genera list.

Newly named birds

Pterosaurs

New taxa

Synapsids

Non-mammalian

References

 Chatterjee, Sankar and Small, Bryan J.; 1989; New plesiosaurs from the Upper Cretaceous of Antarctica; 47 pp. 197–215 in Origins and Evolution of the Antarctic Biota, Geological Society Special Pub., edited by Crame, J.A.
 Sanders F, Manley K, Carpenter K. Gastroliths from the Lower Cretaceous sauropod Cedarosaurus weiskopfae. In: Tanke D.H, Carpenter K, editors. Mesozoic vertebrate life: new research inspired by the paleontology of Philip J. Currie. Indiana University Press; Bloomington, IN: 2001. pp. 166–180.

 
Paleontology
Paleontology 9